Female Werewolf is a 2015 independent horror film that was written and directed by Chris Alexander. The film stars Carrie Gemmel as a woman known only as "She", who believes that she is turning into a werewolf. Female Werewolf marks Gemmel's third film with Alexander, as she had previously appeared in his prior two movies Blood for Irina and Queen of Blood.

Synopsis 
The film follows "She" (Carrie Gemmell), an office woman that initially appears to lead a dull life working at an uninspiring office job. At night, however, she has several surreal fantasies involving sex, blood, and a young woman (Cheryl Singleton) she works with at the office. "She" will occasionally wake up in strange places and is convinced that she's turning into a werewolf - something that she believes is evidenced by her teeth elongating.

Cast 
 Carrie Gemmell as She
 Shauna Henry
 Cheryl Singleton

Reception 
DVD Talk praised Gemmell's performance in Female Werewolf while also stating that the movie would not appeal to all audiences, as it was "a slow moving, deliberate film that is going to appeal to genre nerds of a very specific type, especially those with a soft spot in their hearts for the films of Jean Rollin and Jess Franco." Dread Central made similar comments, also comparing it to Franco while also drawing comparisons to Hélène Cattet and Bruno Forzani.

References

External links
 

2015 films
2015 horror films
American supernatural horror films
American independent films
Canadian independent films
English-language Canadian films
Canadian werewolf films
Films directed by Chris Alexander
2010s English-language films
2010s American films
2010s Canadian films